is a drug manufacturer operating in Japan. It is a subsidiary controlled by Hoffmann-La Roche, which owns 62% of the company as of 30 June 2014.  The company is headquartered in Tokyo. Osamu Nagayama is the current representative director and chairman. Tatsuro Kosaka is the current representative director, president and CEO.

History

Timeline 
This is a timeline of important events of Chugai Pharmaceutical.
 1925: Juzo Ueno founded Chugai Shinyaku Co. Ltd. and started importing and selling medicines
 1927: Start of the first own production
 1930: Salobrocanon, an analgesic (pain reliever) and antipyretic is launched
 1937: Calcium bromide production begins
 1943: Name changed to Chugai Pharmaceutical Co., Ltd. based in Tokyo
 1944: Acquisition of Matsunaga Pharmaceutical Ltd. and construction of a plant in Matsunaga
 1945: The headquarters, the factories in Ikebukuro, Sakai and Takada were destroyed in World War II, the headquarters were relocated to Takada, the factory in Takada was rebuilt
 1946: Construction of the plant in Kamagiishi
 1951: Guronsan®, a drug to detoxify and restore liver function is launched
 1952: Varsan®, a perspiration insecticide is launched
 1955: Chugai became a public company
 1956: The stock is listed on the Tokyo Stock Exchange
 1957: Construction of the Ukima plant
 1960: Establishment of a research center (Takada Research Laboratory, Tokyo)
 1967: Foundation of Fukushima Kasai Co Ltd.
 1961 – Developed patents for synthesis of vitamin A 
 1969: The name of Fukushima Kasai Co Ltd. is changed to Eiko Kasei Co Ltd., after the merger of Fukushima Kasai Co Ltd. and Fukuma Kasau Co. Ltd.
 1971: Construction of the factory in Fujieda
 1975: Picibanil®, a cancer drug is launched
 1982: Opening of a branch in New York
 1986: Opening of a branch in London 
 1989: Acquisition of Gen-Probe Incorporated (USA)
 1990: Epogin® launched
 1995 – Released acute promyelocytic sphere of leukemia drug treatment Vesanoid®
 1996 – Released anti-viral chemotherapeutic agent Hivid® (HIV reverse transcriptase inhibitor)  
 1997 – Released HIV protease inhibitor Invirase®
 1999 – Released immunosuppressive agent Cellcept®
 2000 – Released antiemetic drug Kytril®, developed to combating the side effects of chemotherapy
 2001 – Produced anti-influenza virus Tamiflu (Roche)
 2002: Start of the alliance with Roche
 2003: Xeloda®, a cancer drug is launched
 2005: Actemra® launched
 2007: Copegus®, an antiviral,  Avastin®, a cancer drug, and Tarceva®,  a cancer drug launched
 2011 – Produced Actemra®, a human IL-6 receptor monoclonal antibody for rheumatoid arthritis
 2014: Launch of Kadcyla®, a cancer drug, Chugai Pharma China Co Ltd. founded
 2015 – In March the company announced it would co-commercialise Athersys's stem cell therapy for ischemic strokes in Japan. The deal could yield upwards of US$205 million.
 2016: Cooperation between Osaka University and Chugai
 2018: Tecentriq®, a cancer drug is launched
 2020 – FDA approved satralizumab (Enspryng) for treatment of the orphan disease neuromyelitis optica

See also
 Biotech and pharmaceutical companies in the New York metropolitan area

References

External links
 Chugai Pharmaceutical Co., Ltd. English version of company homepage
 The transfer of operations of the Company

Roche
Pharmaceutical companies of Japan
Manufacturing companies based in Tokyo
Companies listed on the Tokyo Stock Exchange
Orphan drug companies
Japanese companies established in 1943
1943 establishments in Japan